The 14th Alberta Legislative Assembly was in session from February 11, 1960, to May 9, 1963, with the membership of the assembly determined by the results of the 1959 Alberta general election held on June 18, 1959. The Legislature officially resumed on February 11, 1960, and continued until the fifth session was prorogued on March 29, 1963, and dissolved on May 9, 1963, prior to the 1963 Alberta general election.

Alberta's fourteenth government was controlled by the majority Social Credit Party for the seventh time, led by Premier Ernest Manning who would go on to be the longest serving Premier in Alberta history. There was no Official Opposition as three parities and one independent made up the four non-government house seats at one seat apiece. The Speaker was Peter Dawson who would serve until his death on March 24, 1963. Dawson would be replaced as Speaker by Arthur J. Dixon, who would remain the speaker until the fall of the Social Credit government after the 1971 Alberta general election. This was the first assembly elected after the Government of Alberta changed from Single Transferable Vote to First Past the Post.

Standings changes since the 14th general election

Members elected
For complete electoral history, see individual districts.

References

Further reading

External links
Alberta Legislative Assembly
Legislative Assembly of Alberta Members Book
By-elections 1905 to present

15